Natalia Danielle Dyer (born January 13, 1995) is an American actress. She is best known for starring as Nancy Wheeler in the Netflix sci-fi horror series Stranger Things (2016–present). She has also appeared in the films Yes, God, Yes (2019), Velvet Buzzsaw (2019), and Things Heard & Seen (2021).

Early life
Natalia Danielle Dyer was born in Nashville, Tennessee, on January 13, 1995. She has two sisters. She started acting in community theater as a child, and made her professional screen acting debut in Hannah Montana: The Movie, which was filmed locally in 2008. She graduated from the Nashville School of the Arts, then moved to New York City and enrolled at New York University, studying at the Gallatin School of Individualized Study.

Career 
Dyer began her professional career during her early teenage years, taking part in projects produced in and around her home in Tennessee; her first screen role was as Clarissa Granger in Hannah Montana: The Movie in 2009. During this time, she had small roles in the films The Greening of Whitney Brown and Blue Like Jazz before starring in the small independent films Don't Let Me Go and After Darkness; both films were released the following years.

At age sixteen, she filmed the indie film I Believe in Unicorns, which was her first major role. The film premiered three years later at the 2014 SXSW Film Festival.

Dyer's breakthrough role was as Nancy Wheeler in the Netflix series Stranger Things. Dyer has also starred in independent films, most notably the dramedy film Yes, God, Yes (2019) in which she stars as Alice, a Catholic school girl exploring sexuality. Among her more notable credits are supporting roles in the horror films Velvet Buzzsaw (2019) and Things Heard & Seen (2021). In January 2022, it was announced that she would star in horror film All Fun and Games opposite Asa Butterfield.

Personal life 
Since 2016, Dyer has been in a relationship with English actor Charlie Heaton, with whom she co-stars in Stranger Things.

Filmography

Film

Television

Web

Music videos

Theater 
Selected credits

Awards and nominations

Notes

References

External links 

 

1995 births
Living people
Actresses from Nashville, Tennessee
American film actresses
American television actresses
21st-century American actresses
New York University Gallatin School of Individualized Study alumni